Yas  is a playful or non-serious slang term equivalent to the excited or celebratory use of the interjection "yes!", carrying LGBT or queer cultural associations. Yas was added to Oxford Dictionaries in 2017 and defined as a form of exclamation "expressing great pleasure or excitement". Yas was defined by Oxygen's Scout Durwood as "a more emphatic 'yes' often paired with 'queen'." Yas can alternatively be spelled with any number of A's and S's in order to increase the grade of excitement or add more emphasis. In other words, the exclamation often appears in the form "Yas, queen!" and with spelling variants such as "yaas!" or "yaasss!"

History of the term 
The earliest use of the spelling yas quoted in the OED is from George Colman the Elder's play Spleen in 1776: "Rubrick. We'll go in, and prepare the advertisement. Machoof. Yas, we mun invastigate its axcellent faculties." However, this usage is not the modern slang one. Similarly, yass was used by the character Dean Moriarty (based on Neal Cassady) in Jack Kerouac's 1957 novel On the Road.

Yas, with its currently popular meaning and various spelling variants, has roots in late 1980s ball culture, a predominantly Black and Latino LGBT subculture in the United States, and was adopted by the wider LGBT/queer community in the 1990s, remaining current into the present. The term was used during performances by drag queens, as an expression of encouragement and support, and can be heard (pronounced [jæːs]) in the 1990 documentary film Paris Is Burning, which chronicles New York City's ball culture.

The expression entered the general public lexicon in the 2010s after being used by a Lady Gaga fan expressing his admiration for the singer's appearance in a viral video, and by Ilana Glazer in Broad City (there pronounced [jɑːs] and [jʌs]). By 2016, yas had spurred discussion as to whether its use by White or non-LGBT people constituted cultural appropriation.

The verb yassify was coined in 2021 as part of an internet meme. To "yassify" an image is to apply AI-based beauty filters to an extreme extent, with humorous results. Image yassification became a meme on Twitter and other social media, particularly when applied to incongruous subjects such as historic works of art, or a frame of actress Toni Collette screaming in the horror film Hereditary.

See also

 LGBT slang
 List of LGBT slang terms
 Throw shade (slang)

References

2010s slang
Ball culture
LGBT slang